The Invincible Piglet is 2015 Chinese live action/animated children's fantasy adventure film directed by Song Zhantao. It was released on April 3, 2015, in China.

Cast
Cheung Laap Wai 
Zhang Zhilu
Norman Chu
Caterina Murino
Fan Zixuan
He Yuehan
Huang Zanchen
Yu Dongze
Fan Zexi
Zhu Zhelin
Xiao Xiafei

Reception
The film grossed  at the Chinese box office.

References

2010s fantasy adventure films
Chinese fantasy adventure films
Animated adventure films
Chinese animated fantasy films
Chinese children's films
Films with live action and animation